Witjira National Park is a protected area in the Australian state of South Australia about  north of the state capital of Adelaide.

History
The national park was proclaimed on 21 November 1985 to "protect Australia’s largest array of artesian springs: the nationally significant Dalhousie Mound Springs complex".  In 2007, it became the first protected area in South Australia to have formal joint management arrangements between its traditional owners and the Government of South Australia.

The extent of land occupied by the national park was gazetted as a locality in April 2013 under the name "Witjira".

On 26 November 2021, the government changed the conditions of the park, to forever exclude mining in the Dalhousie Springs National Heritage Area.

Description

The national park  is classified as an IUCN Category VI protected area.  It was listed on the now-defunct Register of the National Estate during or after 1998.

The historic Dalhousie Homestead Ruins, from the former Dalhousie Station, lie within the national park and are listed on the South Australian Heritage Register.

See also
 Protected areas of South Australia

References

External links
 Witjira National Park official webpage
Witjira National Park  webpage on protected planet

National parks of South Australia
Protected areas established in 1985
1985 establishments in Australia
Co-managed protected areas in South Australia
Far North (South Australia)
South Australian places listed on the defunct Register of the National Estate